Oktoikh or Oktoih (Russian and Serbian Cyrillic: Октоих) may refer to:

The title of the Church Slavonic Octoechos, an Orthodox liturgical book
Oktoikh, 1491, the first printing of Oktoikh
Oktoih, a 1494 printing of Oktoikh
Oktoikh ensemble